Bernoulli equation may refer to:

Bernoulli differential equation
Bernoulli's equation, in fluid dynamics
Euler–Bernoulli beam equation, in solid mechanics